Kappa Aquilae, Latinized from κ Aquilae, is the Bayer designation for a star in the equatorial constellation of Aquila. It is a faint star at apparent visual magnitude +4.957, but bright enough to be seen with the naked eye in dark suburban skies.

The spectrum of Kappa Aquilae matches a stellar classification of B0.5 III, where the luminosity class of III is typically associated with evolved giant stars. This is a star with 15.50 times the Sun's mass and 12.5 times the radius of the Sun. Massive stars like this blaze brightly; it is radiating 52,630-fold the Sun's luminosity from its outer atmosphere with an effective temperature of 26,500 K, giving it the intense blue-white glow of a B-type star. It is only 11 million years of age and is spinning rapidly with a projected rotational velocity of 265 km/s.

Etymology

This star, together with η Aql, θ Aql, δ Aql, ι Aql and λ Aql were consist Antinous, the obsolete constellation.

References

External links
 Image Kappa Aquilae
 HR 7446

184915
Aquilae, Kappa
Aquila (constellation)
B-type giants
096483
Aquilae, 39
7446
BD-07 5006